Soul catcher is a shamanic amulet.

Soul catcher may also refer to:

Soul Catcher (novel), a 1972 novel by Frank Herbert
 Soul Catcher, a mystical profession in Alyson Noel's Riley Bloom series of fantasy novels.
 "Soul Catcher", a 1993 song on the album Virtual State by Richard Kirk
 "Soul Catcher", a 1997 song on the album Rude System by the Ballistic Brothers
 "Soul Catcher", a 2000 song by on the album NakedSelf by The The